The 2014 Schalke 04 Cup was a two-day pre-season men's football friendly tournament that was hosted by Bundesliga club Schalke 04 and was held at the Veltins-Arena, the club's home ground.

2014 was the inaugural competition of the Schalke 04 Cup. Four teams participated in it, hosts Schalke 04 of the Bundesliga, Newcastle United and West Ham United of the Premier League, and Malaga of La Liga. The first match of each day kicked off at 15:30 CET, with the second match of each day kicking off at 17:45 CET. Schalke 04 contested the second match on both days.

Each match in the Schalke 04 Cup featured two matches of standard 2 x 45 minutes duration. The points were awarded according to a special system, with the winners of each game receiving the usual three points. However, if a game ended in a draw after 90 minutes, it will go straight to a penalty shoot-out. The winners of the shoot-out will gain two points, rather than the usual one point. The team with the highest number of  points from two games will win the trophy.

The tournament was organised by the Swiss company Kentaro AG.

Standings

Matches

Matchday 1

Matchday 2

Goalscorers
2 goals
Samu Castillejo (Málaga)
1 goal
Sergi Darder (Málaga)
Ezequiel Rescaldani (Málaga)
Luis Alberto (Málaga)
Gabriel Obertan (Newcastle United)
Emmanuel Rivière (Newcastle United)
Rolando Aarons (Newcastle United)
Rémy Cabella (Newcastle United)
Donis Avdijaj (Schalke 04)

Media coverage

In Turkey, the tournament was broadcast on TRT Spor, and in the United Kingdom, it was broadcast on Quest.

References

External links

German football friendly trophies
2014–15 in German football
2014–15 in Spanish football
2014–15 in English football